Think Music is an Indian music label headquartered in Chennai, Tamil Nadu that specialises in South Indian film soundtracks.

Overview
Think Music India was started in 2007 and sold its first 46 titles including Vel (2007) and Paiyaa (2010) to Sony Music in 2010. The publisher Believe Digital acquired Think Music in November 2021.

Filmography

Tamil
Lesa Lesa (2003)
Edhiri (2004)
Enthiran (2010)
180 (2011)
Cuckoo (2014)
Indru Netru Naalai (2015)
Papanasam (2015)
36 Vayadhinile (2015)
Valiyavan (2015)
144 (2015)
Server Sundaram (2016)
Tharai Thapattai (2016)
Aranmanai 2 (2016)
Kabali (2016)
Theri (2016)
Vikram Vedha (2017)
Meesaya Murukku (2017)
Chennai 2 Singapore (2017)
96 (2018)
Imaikka Nodigal (2018)
60 Vayadu Maaniram (2018)
Seemaraja (2018)
Natpe Thunai (2019)
Mr. Local (2019)
Maara (2021)
Karnan (2021)
Sivakumarin Sabadham (2021)
 Kathir (2022)
 D Block (2022)
 The Legend (2022)
 Naan Mirugamaai Maara (2022)
 Bommai (2022)

Malayalam
 Ohm Shanti Oshaana (2014)
Hridayam (2022)
 Saudi Vellakka (2022)
 Vaashi (2022)

Telugu
A1 Express (2021)

References

External links

Record label distributors
Companies based in Chennai
Indian record labels
Indian music record labels
2007 establishments in Tamil Nadu
Record labels established in 2007
Indian companies established in 2007